EarthGang (stylized EARTHGANG) is an American hip hop duo from Atlanta, Georgia, composed of Olu (aka Johnny Venus) and WowGr8 (aka Doctur Dot – born Eian Parker). They are co-founders of the musical collective Spillage Village, with JID, Hollywood JB, JordxnBryant, 6LACK, Mereba, and Benji.

Formed in 2008, EarthGang released their first EP, The Better Party, in 2010. This was followed by several singles and two mixtapes, Mad Men and Good News in 2011. In 2013, the duo released their debut album Shallow Graves For Toys and was largely well-received, with Noisey calling it "one of the most well thought-out releases of the year" and praising the album's "playful delivery and biting lyricism." Their second album, Strays with Rabies, was released to positive reviews in 2015. After signing to J. Cole's Dreamville Records, EarthGang released a trilogy of EPs: Rags, Robots (2017), and Royalty (2018), leading up to their major label debut album, Mirrorland (2019).

History

2008–2009: Formation
The rap duo EarthGang was first formed in 2008 by Johnny Venus and Doctur Dot, then both high school students in Atlanta, Georgia. According to Johnny Venus, they had first met on a field trip in 9th grade at Benjamin Elijah Mays High School, with Venus later approaching Doctur Dot to ask about forming a music group. Avid fans of rap and hip hop, both members had grown up listening to artists as diverse as the Ohio Players, Dizzy Gillespie, Madonna, and Richard Pryor. About their name EarthGang, Venus explained in 2011 that "The name came to me abruptly one day. It represents what we're made of and why we do what we do. It's for the people by the people. Our music is influenced by the conscious and subconscious, and we create it to influence the like."

2010–2013: Early releases
On January 26, 2010, the group released its first EP, the mixtape titled The Better Party. Their first full-length recording project, they recorded in a multitude of studio spaces, which, according to Venus, included "dorm rooms at Hampton University, closets in Atlanta, a house studio owned by 'Mr. Fish' (a fellow underground Atlanta musician), and finally in Hampton University's Music Recording Technology Jazz studio." The EP was mixed and mastered by EarthGang, with help from Jack Swain. Also in 2010, they began touring in the United States, performing at festivals such as the A3C Festival in Atlanta. They released periodic singles as well, and in November 2010 they debuted the song "Miss the Show." In early 2011 they taped and released a music video for "Kick'n It", a track first included on The Better Party. Soon afterwards they released the single "Opium", which they would later film a music video for. The group self-released two albums in 2011: Mad Men in April, and Good News in December.

They released their track "The F Bomb" on June 4, 2012. The song would later be included on a 2014 album and was made into a music video. "Machete", a single produced by 808 Mafia, was self-released by EarthGang on February 10, 2013, shortly before the release of their music video for their 2012 single "Fire Kicking Tree Limbs". In March 2013 the group released "UFOs", a slow single over nine minutes long. According to a review in Pigeons and Planes, "Sexual, contemplative, sprawling, and slow, EarthGang's 'UFOs' veers far left from the duo's last music expedition 'Machete' and hews a bit closer to the earthy soul that typified so much mid-'90s Dungeon Family output." They again performed at the A3C Festival in early 2013, also opening for Black Fest at Stanford University.

2013–2016: Shallow Graves for Toys and Strays With Rabies 
On July 8, 2013, EarthGang released their album Shallow Graves for Toys on the imprint Spillage Village. The album includes several singles released earlier, such as "The F Bomb", "UFOs", and "Machete". "The F Bomb" was produced by Hollywood JB of Spillage Village. The album was re-released on iTunes in the summer of 2014. In response to Shallow Graves For Toys, in 2014, Noisey called EarthGang "an engaging, clever rap duo", praising the album's "playful delivery and biting lyricism" and calling it "one of the most well thought-out releases of the year." Since the album, EarthGang has released several official music videos from the album. In the summer of 2014, the video for "The F Bomb" was released. On September 20, 2014, EarthGang began supporting a 40 date tour with their collaborator Ab-Soul, a member of Top Dawg Entertainment. 

On February 26, 2015, EarthGang released a 7 track EP called Torba with track titles for each day of the week. The EP included features from Mac Miller, OG Maco, and JordxnBryant, with production from Childish Major, Shine, Zeroh, Hollywood JB, and more. On July 6, Spillage Village released their second collaboration project Bears Like This Too. On November 6, 2015, EarthGang released their second album, entitled Strays with Rabies. The album includes features and cuts from JID, DJ Khalil, DrewsThatDuDe, Ducko McFli, J.U.S.T.I.C.E. League, Richie Quake, SykSense. They were also one of the featuring artists on Mac Miller's GO:OD AM tour. EarthGang has stated they as well contributed to the production of the album. On June 3, 2016, the duo would join Dreamville Records' Bas on his nationwide Too High to Riot Tour. The tour would later be reprised in Europe on November 13. On December 2, 2016, Spillage Village released Bears Like This Too Much with features from J. Cole and Bas, and production from Mac Miller, Ducko Mcfli, Childish Major and J. Cole among others.

2017–2019: Rags, Robots, Royalty, and Mirrorland
On August 31, 2017, rapper J. Cole's imprint Dreamville Records announced the signing of the duo and they released their Dreamville debut project the following day, the first extended play from their trilogy titled Rags.  The project features guest appearances from DC Young Fly, Childish Major, Mick Jenkins, and fellow Spilage Village member and Dreamville artist JID. Their second EP in the trilogy Robots was released on October 20, with SiR as a guest feature. The third was released on February 23, 2018, named Royalty, with features coming from Ari Lennox and Mereba. In 2017 and 2018, EarthGang co-headlined in the North American and European Never Had Shit Tour with JID, and guests Lute, Chaz French, and Mereba. A year after serving as the opening act on the European leg of J. Cole's 4 Your Eyez Only World Tour, EarthGang were also the supporting act on 36 shows of the North American KOD Tour in 2018.

On September 4, 2018, EarthGang premiered the song "Up" on the Berlin platform Colors Studio. On September 21, they released a single titled "Stuck" featuring Arin Ray. In January 2019, the duo announced that they will be a supporting act for Smino on the Hoopti Tour. On February 5, 2019, they released the second single "Proud of U" featuring Young Thug. On July 5, 2019, Dreamville Records released their 3rd collaborative album, Revenge of the Dreamers III. Earthgang contributed to five songs including "Down Bad", "Swivel", and "Sacrifices" on the album. On August 30, they officially released the single "Up", and "Ready to Die" on September 2. Mirrorland was released on September 6, 2019, and includes features from Young Thug, T-Pain, Kehlani, and Arin Ray. The production of the album was handled by a variety of producers including Olu, J. Cole, Elite, Ron Gilmore, Christo, Bink, DJ Dahi, Childish Major and Groove, among others.

2020–present: Spilligion and Ghetto Gods
On September 25, 2020, Spillage Village released their fourth collective album Spilligion, with EarthGang part of the singles "End of Daze", "Baptize", and "Hapi". The duo also released the single "Powered Up" and appeared on songs with TOKiMONSTA, Louis The Child, Sinéad Harnett, and Gorillaz in 2020. On December 18, EarthGang released the first single from their next album, "Options" featuring Wale. On February 16, 2021, EarthGang revealed the album title, Ghetto Gods.

On December 8, 2021, EarthGang released the first official single for the album titled "American Horror Story". On January 14, 2022, the second single titled "All Eyes On Me" was released, accompanied by a music video. The third single, "Amen" featuring Musiq Soulchild was released on February 22, and was premiered on the Apple Music 1 radio show. On the same day, they also announced the Biodeghettable Tour, with Mike Dimes and Pigeons & Planes supporting. On February 25, 2022, Ghetto Gods was released, including guest appearances from Future, JID, J. Cole, Musiq Soulchild, Baby Tate, Lynae Vanee, CeeLo Green, Nick Cannon, and Ari Lennox. On March 31, they appeared on the Dreamville compilation D-Day: A Gangsta Grillz Mixtape, on the songs "Ghetto Gods Freestyle", "Jozi Flows" and "Everybody Ain't Shit".

Musical style
Incorporating Southern hip hop and genres such as funk and soul music, EarthGang has drawn comparisons to groups such as Outkast, Dungeon Family and The Pharcyde, among other artists. Stated the duo in early 2011, "When we create, our goal is to set the listener in a mood for each track... the style is all a part of the execution. You'll hear who we are, where we're from, and what sounds we like through our music. We pay attention to details."

Members
 Olu (aka Johnny Venus) – born Olu O. Fann on October 9, 1989
 WowGr8 (aka Doctur Dot) – born Eian Undrai Parker on October 25, 1990

Discography

Albums

Extended plays

Mixtapes

Compilation albums

Collaborative albums

Singles

As lead artist

As featured artist

Other charted songs

Guest appearances

Tours

Headlining
 Never Had Shit Tour  (2017–18)
 What On Earth Tour (2019)
 Welcome to Mirrorland (2019–20)
 Biodeghettable (2022)

Supporting
 These Days Tour  (2014) 
 GO:OD AM Tour  (2015)
 Too High To Riot Tour  (2016) 
 4 Your Eyez Only Tour  (2017)
 KOD Tour  (2018)
 1 by 1 Tour  (2018–19)
 Hoopti Tour  (2019)
 North America Tour Fall 2022  (2022)

Awards and nominations

References

External links

EarthGang.net
EarthGang on Facebook
EarthGang on Twitter

Audio and video
EarthGang on YouTube
EarthGang on VEVO
EarthGang on Bandcamp
EarthGang on SoundCloud

Hip hop duos
American hip hop groups
Dreamville Records artists
Rappers from Atlanta
African-American musical groups